The 14003 / 14004 Malda Town–New Delhi (New Farakka) Express is an Express train belonging to Northern Railway zone that runs between  and  in India. It is currently being operated with 14003/14004 train numbers on bi-weekly basis.

Service

The 14003 Malda Town–New Delhi New Farakka Express has an average speed of 48 km/hr and covers 1425 km in 29h 35m. 14004 New Delhi–Malda Town New Farakka Express has an average speed of 48 km/hr and covers 1425 km in 29h 35m.

Route & Halts 

The important halts of the train are:

Coach composition

The train has LHB rakes with max speed of 160 kmph. The train consists of 22 coaches:

 1 AC II Tier
 2 AC III Tier
 11 Sleeper coaches
 6 General
 2 EOG

Traction

Both trains are hauled by a Tughlakabad-based WDM-3A / WDM-3D diesel locomotive from Malda Town to New Delhi and vice versa.

Rake sharing

The train shares its rake with 22403/22404 Puducherry–New Delhi Express.

See also 

 Malda Town railway station
 Delhi Junction railway station
 Farakka Express (via Sultanpur)
 Farakka Express (via Faizabad)
 Puducherry–New Delhi Express

Notes

References

External links 

 14003/Malda Town–New Delhi Express
 14004/New Delhi–Malda Town Express

Transport in Delhi
Transport in Maldah
Express trains in India
Rail transport in Jharkhand
Rail transport in Delhi
Rail transport in West Bengal
Rail transport in Bihar
Rail transport in Uttar Pradesh
Railway services introduced in 2010